The George Mason Patriots men's basketball team represents George Mason University. The Patriots play at the EagleBank Arena in Fairfax, Virginia, on the George Mason campus.

Team records
 Most wins – 27 during the 2005–06 and 2010–11 seasons
 Most losses – 23 during the 1969–70 season
 Longest Winning Streak – 16 during the 2010–2011 season

Game
 Most points – 42 by Carlos Yates (vs. Navy) on February 27, 1985
 Most field goals made – 18 by Rudolph Jones (vs. Bowie State) on January 18, 1973
 Most field goal attempts – 36 by Rudolph Jones (vs. Bowie State) on January 18, 1973
 Most 3-pointers made – 10 by Dre Smith (vs. James Madison) on January 19, 2008
 Most 3-pointers attempted – 20 by Riley Trone (vs. Troy State) on November 27, 1993
 Most free throws made – 20 by Terry Henderson (vs. Rider) on January 19, 1980
 Most free throws attempted – 23 by Terry Henderson (vs. Rider) on January 19, 1980
 Most rebounds – 24 by Jim Nowers (vs. D.C. Teachers) on February 23, 1974
 Most assists – 15 by Curtis McCants (vs. Richmond) on February 22, 1995
 Most blocks – 10 by Byron Tucker (vs. Miami (FL)) on November 23, 1990
 Most steals – 9 by Tony Skinn (vs. Northeastern) on January 19, 2006

Season
 Most points – 779 by Rudolph Jones in 1972–73 season
 Most field goals made – 327 by Rudolph Jones in 1972–73 season
 Most field goal attempts – 727 by Rudolph Jones in 1972–73 season
 Most 3-pointers made – 99 by Donald Ross in 1993–94 season
 Most 3-pointers attempted – 278 by Donald Ross in 1993–94 season
 Most free throws made – 209 by Carlos Yates in 1982–83 season
 Most free throws attempted – 266 by Carlos Yates in 1982–83 season
 Most rebounds – 369 by Marquise Moore in 2016–17 season
 Most assists – 251 by Curtis McCants in 1994–95 season
 Most blocks – 92 by A.J. Wilson in 2019–20 season
 Most steals – 96 by Myron Contee in 1978–79 season

Career
 Most points – 2,420 by Carlos Yates
 Most field goals made – 865 by Carlos Yates
 Most field goal attempts – 1,766 by Carlos Yates
 Most 3-pointers made – 251 by Donald Ross
 Most 3-pointers attempted – 737 by Donald Ross
 Most free throws made – 690 by Carlos Yates
 Most free throws attempted – 921 by Carlos Yates
 Most rebounds – 1,048 by Jim Nowers
 Most assists – 598 by Curtis McCants
 Most blocks – 212 by A.J. Wilson
 Most steals – 211 by George Evans

Player honors

Eastern College Athletic Conference South (1978–1985)
Player of the Year

Rookie of the Year

All-Conference

Colonial Athletic Association (1986–2013)
Player of the Year

Rookie of the Year

All-Conference

Atlantic 10 Conference (2014–present)
Rookie of the Year

All-Conference

All-time leaders

Notable players

Bryon Allen (born 1992), basketball player for Hapoel Eilat of the Israeli Basketball Premier League
Cameron Long (born 1988), basketball player in the Israeli Premier League
 Darryl Monroe (born 1986), professional basketball player, 2016 Israeli Basketball Premier League MVP

Coaches

Current coaching staff
 Kim English – Head Coach
 Dennis Felton – Associate Head Coach
 Duane Simpkins – Assistant Coach
 Nate Tomlinson – Assistant Coach
 T.J. Grams – Director of Basketball Operations 
 I.J. Poole – Director of Player Personnel and Scouting

All-time standings

Postseason results

NCAA Division I Tournament results
The Patriots have appeared in the NCAA tournament six times. Their combined record is 5–6.

NIT results
The Patriots have appeared in the National Invitation Tournament (NIT) four times. Their combined record is 3–4.

CBI results
The Patriots have appeared in the College Basketball Invitational (CBI) two times. Their combined record is 4–3.

CIT results
The Patriots have appeared in the CollegeInsider.com Postseason Tournament (CIT) one time. Their record is 0–1.

References

External links